Bertalan Székely (8 May 1835, Kolozsvár, Transylvania, Kingdom of Hungary (Now Cluj-Napoca after annexation by Romania following the Treaty of Trianon – 21 August 1910, Budapest) was a  Hungarian history and portrait painter who worked in the Romantic and Academic styles.

Biography 
Born into a family that was originally part of the Transylvanian nobility, his father was a court clerk. Although his family wanted him to become an engineer, he studied at the Academy of Fine Arts, Vienna from 1851 to 1855, under Johann Nepomuk Geiger and Carl Rahl. He then returned to his hometown where, for the next three years, he worked as an art teacher. After a year of employment with Count Aichelburg in Marschendorf, he married and moved to Munich, where he studied with Karl von Piloty. It was there that he first developed his interest in history painting. In 1862, he settled in Pest.

The following year, he won a contest with his painting "The Escape of Emperor Charles VII" and used the prize money to finance a trip to the Netherlands and Paris, returning in 1864. He became one of the first teachers hired at the new "Hungarian Royal Drawing School" (now the Hungarian University of Fine Arts) in 1871 and served as its Director from 1902 to 1905, when he took over the master classes.

From the 1860s through the 1880s, he mostly painted portraits and female figures, then turned to landscapes. He also created decorative murals in the Matthias Church, Budapest Opera House and the City Hall in Kecskemét. Later, he became interested in the movement studies made by Edweard Muybridge and Étienne-Jules Marey and conducted some of his own.

Selected paintings

Writings
 Székely Bertalan válogatott művészeti írásai (selected writings on art), introduction by  László Maksay, Képzőművészeti Alap Kiadóvállalata, Budapest, 1962

References

 Exhibition flyer, 4 April through 28 June 2009 @ the Művészetek Háza in Miskolc (includes a biographical time-line)

Further reading 
 Zsuzsanna Bakó, Székely Bertalan (1835–1910), Kep. Kiadó, Budapest 1982, 
 Székely Bertalan mozgástanulmányai (motion studies), edited by Annamária Szőke and László Beke, Budapest, 1992,  
 Éva Bicskei, Ámor és Hymen: A fiatal Székely Bertalan szerelmi történetei (Amor and Hymen: Love Stories of the Young Bertalan Székely), Budapest: Akadémiai Kiadó, 2010

External links 

 Hungarian Art History: "Looking Down Into the Abyss: Bertalan Székely and the Perils of Love" 
 Bertalan Székely Remembered by Árpád Schauschek @ the Magyar Elektronikus Kõnyvtár

1835 births
1910 deaths
Academic staff of the Hungarian University of Fine Arts
History painters
Portrait painters
19th-century Hungarian painters
20th-century Hungarian painters